Council of Interstate Testing Agencies (CITA) is one of five examination agencies for dentists in the United States. The other examination agencies are, Central Regional Dental Testing Service, West Regional Examining Board, Northeast Regional Board of Dental Examiners, and Southern Regional Testing Agency. These were organized to standardize clinical exams for licensure.
The CITA examination is recognized for licensure in a total of twenty-six (26) states/territories.

Member states that help create the exam are: Alabama, Kentucky, Louisiana, North Carolina, West Virginia, and Puerto Rico.

Other states that accept the exam for licensure: Colorado, Kansas, Illinois, Maine, Massachusetts, Minnesota, Mississippi, Missouri, Montana, Nebraska, New Hampshire, New Mexico, North Dakota, Oregon, Pennsylvania, Puerto Rico, Texas, Vermont (dental only), Virginia, Washington (dental only), and Wisconsin

External links 
 CITA website

Dental examinations
Standardized tests in the United States